Torroella de Fluvià is a municipality in the comarca of Alt Empordà, Girona, Catalonia, Spain. It includes the village of Vilacolum. The 11th Century Church of Sant Tomàs de Fluvià is a notable romanesque landmark.

References

External links
 Government data pages 

Municipalities in Alt Empordà